Night Nurse is a 1982 studio album by Gregory Isaacs.

Night Nurse is reggae artist Gregory Isaacs' most well-known album. It contains his biggest hit, "Night Nurse" as well as several other notable tracks. Backing came from the Roots Radics, with additional synthesizer added by Wally Badarou. The album was released on vinyl and cassette, then later in 1990 on compact disc. It reached No. 32 on the UK Albums Chart. A reissue released in 2002 includes four additional bonus tracks.

Track listing
All tracks composed by Gregory Isaacs and Sylvester Weise.

 "Night Nurse"  – 4:04
 "Stranger in Town"  – 3:32
 "Objection Overruled"  – 3:56
 "Hot Stepper"  – 4:29
 "Cool Down the Pace"  – 5:16
 "Material Man"  – 3:34
 "Not the Way"  – 3:49
 "Sad to Know (You're Leaving)"  – 4:12

Bonus tracks on CD 2002 reissue
 "Cool Down the Dub" 
 "Night Nurse Dub 2" 
 "Cool Down the Pace" - (10" mix)
 "Unhappy Departure Dub"
" No Good Girl" - (10" mix)

Personnel
Gregory Isaacs - vocals
The Roots Radics
Errol "Flabba" Holt - bass guitar, associate producer
Lincoln "Style" Scott - drums
Dwight "Brother Dee" Pinkney - lead guitar
Eric "Bingy Bunny" Lamont - rhythm guitar
Wycliffe "Steelie" Johnson - keyboards
with:
Wally Badarou - Prophet synthesizer, synthesizer
Technical
Errol Brown - engineer
Godwin Logie - mixing at Compass Point Studios, Nassau, Bahamas
Don Taylor Artist Management - direction
Stylo Rouge - art direction
Johnnie Black - photography

Certifications

References

1982 albums
Gregory Isaacs albums
Mango Records albums
Island Records albums